César Morales Velazquez (born March 4, 1978 in Ecatepec de Morelos) is a bantamweight boxer from Mexico, who represented his native country at the 2000 Summer Olympics in Sydney, Australia.

Pro career
He made his debut as a pro in 2001, and captured the Vacant WBO Inter-Continental Bantamweight Title three years later by defeating Clarence Vinson of the United States. On July 28, 2006 he lost to Al Seeger in the fight for the IBA Super Bantamweight in Savannah, Georgia.

External links
 

1978 births
Living people
Boxers from the State of Mexico
People from Ecatepec de Morelos
Bantamweight boxers
Boxers at the 2000 Summer Olympics
Olympic boxers of Mexico
Mexican male boxers